Fonovisa Records is an American Spanish language record label founded in 1984 by Guillermo Santiso as a subsidiary of Televisa. Its former name before being acquired by Televisa in 1984 was Profono Internacional, which was founded in 1978. Fonovisa mainly produces Mexican style music. It is well known for its signing with artists such as Los Tigres Del Norte, Los Bukis,  Los Temerarios, Enrique Iglesias, Lucero and Thalía.

In late 2002, Fonovisa was acquired from Televisa by the Univision Music Group. Fonovisa was owned by the Univision Music Group until May 2008 when it was bought by Universal Music Group. It is now part of Universal Music Latin Entertainment. Fonovisa headquarters are now in the Capitol Record Building, in Hollywood, California.

Lawsuits
On January 25, 1996, Fonovisa was allowed to proceed with its copyright infringement lawsuit against Cherry Auction (which is known for operating the Cherry Avenue Auction in Fresno, CA) for allowing vendors to sell unlicensed records.

Fonovisa itself, however, became the subject of controversy in 1999 when the record label admitted to paying radio stations millions of dollars in payola to play songs from Fonovisa artists. Santiso was also charged with tax evasion during the process.

Artists

Alacranes Musical
Alicia Villarreal
Alejandro Fernández
Grupo Aroma
Avenida 6
After Party
Alfredo Olivas
Banda El Recodo
Banda Pequeños Musical
Bronco
Chiquis
Conjunto Primavera
Cristina
Crecer Germán
Conjunto Azabache
Cuisillos
Enrique Iglesias
El De La H
El Potro de Sinaloa
El Tigrillo Palma
Grupo Exterminador
Grupo Bryndis
Graciela Beltrán
German Montero
Hechizeros Band
Ivan
Jesús Chaparro
Juan Gabriel
Juan Rivera
Julión Álvarez
Jazmín López
Joan Sebastian
José Huerta
Lorenzo Antonio
Los Acosta
Los Bondadosos
Los Temerarios
Los Tigres del Norte
Los Tucanes de Tijuana
Los Canelos de Durango
Larry Hernandez
Marco Antonio Solis
Patrulla 81
Pedro Fernández
Roberto Tapia
Saul El Jaguar
Sparx
El Trono de Mexico
Vikilo

Former artists

Ana Bárbara
Anahí
Cristian Castro
Crooked Stilo
Elsa García
Enrique Iglesias
La Mafia
Los Bukis
Los Palominos
Lucero
Menudo
Noelia
Thalía
Timbiriche
Tropa F
Los Acuario De Mexico
Jenni Rivera

See also
 List of record labels

References

External links
 Official site 

Record labels established in 1986
2002 mergers and acquisitions
2008 mergers and acquisitions
American record labels
Universal Music Latin Entertainment
Mexican record labels
Pop record labels
Latin American music record labels
Companies based in Los Angeles County, California